The first USS Mallard (AM-44/ASR-4)  was a  in the United States Navy. She was later converted to a submarine rescue ship.

Mallard was laid down by Staten Island Shipbuilding Company, New York City, 25 May 1918; launched 17 December 1918; sponsored by Mrs. Harry R. Brayton, wife of the commanding officer at commissioning; and commissioned 25 June 1919.

Post-World War I Atlantic operations  
Assigned to the Atlantic Fleet, Mallard conducted minesweep duties in the 3rd Naval District through the next nine years. Transferred to submarine rescue operations following conversion at Boston Navy Yard June to December 1928, Mallard was redesignated ASR-4 on 12 September 1929. From January to March 1929 she joined submarine  in experimental maneuvers off Key West, Florida.

World War II assignment  
The next year Mallard sailed for Coco Solo, her new home port, for patrol off Panama, where she remained throughout World War II attached to Submarine Squadron 3. During that time she performed target towing and diver training services for ships of the fleet.

End-of-War decommissioning  
In May 1946 she sailed for the east coast, arriving New York Navy Yard to be decommissioned 10 December and stripped.

References

External links 
 
Rescue and Salvage Ships
Ships List

 

Lapwing-class minesweepers
Ships built in Staten Island
1918 ships
World War II auxiliary ships of the United States
Lapwing-class minesweepers converted to submarine rescue ships
Ships sunk as targets
Maritime incidents in 1947
Submarine rescue ships